Basen is a village in the Akhuryan Municipality of the Shirak Province of Armenia. The Statistical Committee of Armenia reported its population was 1,913 in 2010, up from 1,744 at the 2001 census.

Etymology 
The village was known as Mets Kyapanak until 1935.

Demographics

References 

Communities in Shirak Province
Populated places in Shirak Province